Common Law is an American television sitcom that premiered on ABC on September 28, 1996. The show stars Greg Giraldo as a Latino lawyer at a mostly white law firm. The series was created by Rob LaZebnik, and produced by Witt/Thomas Productions in association with Warner Bros. Television.

Due to low ratings, the series was pulled from ABC's schedule after four episodes had aired.

Synopsis
Common Law focuses on John Alvarez (Greg Giraldo), the seemingly-token  Latino at a large, WASPy law firm.  John has a degree from Harvard Law School, but never forgets his working-class Queens roots, nor the idea that law is about protecting the "little guy" from the major corporations that are his firms' key clients.  He has started a clandestine affair with fellow attorney Nancy Slaton (Megyn Price), clandestine because the firm forbids lawyers from dating each other to minimize claims of sexual harassment. To the disgust of his barber father, Luis (Gregory Sierra), John wears his hair long and plays guitar; his father views him as a hippie. Greg Giraldo was in reality a graduate of Harvard Law School nearly top of his class, and became a lawyer for a while before becoming a comedian. After a year as an attorney, Giraldo fell out of love with the profession and launched his comedy career, only referring to his law background very occasionally on the stand-up circuit, until he starred in this series.

Supporters of Common Law pointed to the Saturday 9:30/8:30 time slot as a factor in its poor ratings and subsequent cancellation despite having the long-running ABC sitcom Coach as its lead-in. The series garnered much praise from the Latino community, who were happy to see a character and entertainer of Latino descent starring in such an upscale role. Subsequently, they gave ABC much backlash when the show was canceled.

Cast
Greg Giraldo as lawyer John Alvarez
Megyn Price as lawyer Nancy Slaton
David Pasquesi as Henry Beckett
Carlos Jacott as Peter Gutenhimmel
Diana-Maria Riva as receptionist Maria Marquez
Gregory Sierra as John's father Luis Alvarez
John Di Maggio as John's childhood friend Francis

Episodes

References

Brooks, Tim and Marsh, Earle, The Complete Directory to Prime Time Network and Cable TV Shows

External links

1990s American sitcoms
1996 American television series debuts
1996 American television series endings
1990s American legal television series
American Broadcasting Company original programming
English-language television shows
Television series by Warner Bros. Television Studios
Television shows set in New York City
Latino sitcoms